Aleksandr Tsiboulski (born 1979) is a Ukrainian-Australian classical guitarist. With his family he migrated to Adelaide in 1989, aged 10, his father was a school teacher and his mother was an engineer. Tsiboulski issued his first solo album, Fandangos y Boleros, in 2003, which was produced and audio engineered by John Taylor; it had been recorded in early May 2002 in England.

His second album, Australian Guitar Music, appeared in 2010 via Naxos Records with Norbert Kraft and Bonnie Silver producing during mid-July 2008 at St. John Chrysostom Church, Newmarket, Ontario, Canada. At the ARIA Music Awards of 2010 it was nominated for Best Classical Album.

Discography

Albums

Awards and nominations

ARIA Music Awards
The ARIA Music Awards is an annual awards ceremony that recognises excellence, innovation, and achievement across all genres of Australian music. They commenced in 1987. 

! 
|-
| 2010
| Australian Guitar Music
| Best Classical Album
| 
| 
|-

References

External links
 

1979 births
Australian musicians
Living people